Smithy is a 1933 British comedy drama film directed by George King and starring Edmund Gwenn, Peggy Novak and D. A. Clarke-Smith. It was made as a quota quickie by the British subsidiary of Warner Brothers at their Teddington Studios.

Cast
 Edmund Gwenn as John Smith  
 Peggy Novak as Jane  
 D. A. Clarke-Smith as Boyd  
 Eve Gray as Daughter  
 Clifford Heatherley as Sir Olds  
 Viola Compton as Lucy  
 Charles Hickman  as Son 
 Charles Hawtrey

References

Bibliography
 Low, Rachael. Filmmaking in 1930s Britain. George Allen & Unwin, 1985.
 Wood, Linda. British Films, 1927-1939. British Film Institute, 1986.

External links

1933 films
British comedy-drama films
1933 comedy-drama films
Films shot at Teddington Studios
Quota quickies
Films directed by George King
Warner Bros. films
Films set in England
British black-and-white films
1930s English-language films
1930s British films